Square the Circle may refer to:

Square the Circle (Joan Armatrading album)
Square the Circle (Mami Kawada album)

See also
Squaring the circle, a geometric problem
Squaring the circle (disambiguation)
Squared circle (disambiguation)
Tarski's circle-squaring problem
Square Circle Production, a magic trick
The Square Circle, a 1982 novel by Daniel Carney